Kim Heung-Il (born 2 November 1992) is a South Korean footballer who plays as forward for Daegu FC in K League Challenge.

Career
He joined Daegu FC in December 2012 and became a Daegu FC's first ever player who graduated from a youth team of the club.

References

External links 

1992 births
Living people
Association football forwards
South Korean footballers
Daegu FC players
K League 1 players
K League 2 players